Flag of the Republic of Kosovo was adopted by the Assembly of the Republic of Kosovo immediately following the unilateral declaration of independence of Kosovo of 17 February 2008. The flag design emerged from an international competition, organized by the United Nations-backed Kosovo Unity Team, which attracted almost one thousand entries. The winning design was proposed by Muhamer Ibrahimi. It shows six white stars in an arc above a golden map of Kosovo, all on a blue field. The stars symbolize Kosovo's six major ethnic groups: Albanians, Serbs, Bosniaks, Turks, Romani, and Gorani.

Before the declaration of independence, Kosovo had come under the administration of the United Nations and used the UN flag for official purposes. The Serb and Albanian populations had used their own national flags since the 1945–1992 Socialist Yugoslavia period. The Serbs use a red, blue and white tricolor, which also forms the basis of the flag of Serbia. The Albanian population have used the flag of Albania since the 1960s as their ethnic flag. Both these flags can still be seen in use within Kosovo.

Serbia has not recognized the independence of Kosovo and claims the area as the Autonomous Province of Kosovo and Metohija. Unlike the case of the autonomous province of Vojvodina, the Serbian authorities have not adopted a unique flag to represent this claimed province, using the flag of Serbia instead.

Design and use

The flag of Kosovo has a blue background, charged with a map of Kosovo and six stars. The stars are officially meant to symbolize Kosovo's six major ethnic groups: Albanians, Serbs, Bosniaks, Turks, Romani (often grouped with the Ashkali and Egyptians) and Gorani. Unofficially, the stars are sometimes said to represent the six regions, which according to Albanian ultra-nationalist ideology, make up Greater Albania: Albania, Kosovo, western parts of North Macedonia, parts of northern Greece, parts of Montenegro and Preševo Valley in southern Serbia. The flag of Kosovo resembles that of Bosnia and Herzegovina in terms of colors and shapes used (white stars and yellow shape of the country on a blue field). The flag is unusual among national flags in using a map as a design element; the flag of Cyprus is the only other to do so. The ratio of the flag was announced during the contest as 2:3; with the passage of a diplomatic protocol law in Kosovo in April 2009, the ratio was set as 1:1.4 (5:7 when put in whole numbers). The colors and construction of the Kosovo flag have not yet been defined; however, an official government document does give the colors of the flag using CMYK. The unofficial RGB values of the flag have been manually extracted since 2009. The use of the Kosovo flag is regulated by the law: "Law on the Use of Kosovo State Symbols". However, the Serbian government objects to the use of the Kosovo flag at international meetings and gatherings.

Colours and sizes

Use of Albanian and Serbian flags in Kosovo

The Albanian flag remains popular with Kosovo Albanians.

Serbia does not recognize the 2008 secession of Kosovo and considers it a United Nations-governed entity within its sovereign territory, the Autonomous Province of Kosovo and Metohija, as defined by the 2006 Constitution of Serbia.

Even months after Kosovo's declaration of independence, the Serbian flag was still seen at official government buildings until officially replaced by the Kosovo government. Flags of Serbia and Serbian Orthodox Church were used in protests against Kosovo independence and still can be seen in Serb-majority areas in the north.

However, a person was sentenced by a panel of EULEX judges on 19 November 2009, for inciting hatred by raising a Serbian flag on a mosque in the southern part of Mitrovica (among other charges of discord/intolerance and attempted aggravated murder of a police officer).

Historical flags

Kosovo in SFR Yugoslavia / Serbia and Montenegro
Until 2008, Kosovo did not have a flag of its own. However, during different periods of history, different flags were flown in Kosovo. Before 1969, the only flags that could legally fly over Kosovo (then an autonomous province) were those of SFR Yugoslavia and SR Serbia. If a nationalist flag were flown, such as Albanian, Serbian or Croatian, a person could go to prison for doing so.

In 1969, the Kosovar Albanian population was able to use a variant of the Albanian flag as its ethnic flag. However, the flag had to be charged with a red star, since this was a common symbol of the Yugoslav nation. Even without this requirement, the flag of the People's Socialist Republic of Albania at the time had a red star, outlined in gold, above the double headed eagle. Later on, different nationalities in Kosovo could use their own national flags in accordance with legislation.

Before the death of Yugoslav leader Josip Broz Tito and the breakup of SFR Yugoslavia, there were calls for the Albanian flag to be banned because residents in Kosovo did not want to live under a foreign flag. This sentiment culminated in the "Petition of the 2016", which called for, among other items, a greater statehood status for Serbia and the removal of all Albanian symbols. The Serbian side also began to remove the red star from the Yugoslav flag, using it for protests to counterbalance the Albanian population and to promote a Greater Serbia.

Kosovo under United Nations administration

When Kosovo was under the administration of the United Nations Interim Administration Mission in Kosovo (UNMIK), the UN flag was flown in Kosovo for official purposes. The Constitutional Framework for Self Government in Kosovo, promulgated in May 2001, allowed institutions to use approved symbols if authorized by UNMIK.
Specific flags and emblems were authorized for used by the Kosovo Police Service, Kosovo Protection Corps and the Provisional Institutions of Self-Government. Some municipalities in Kosovo also adopted official symbols during the period of administration by UNMIK. The NATO-led international peacekeeping force in Kosovo, KFOR, also used a distinctive flag during this period.

However, many Kosovo Albanians usually used the Albanian flag. The Albanian flag was also used on public buildings, even though it was against UN regulations. Regulations stated only the UN flag and other authorized flags, like those of institutions and cities, could fly on public buildings. If the Albanian flag was flown, then the Serbian flag was to have been flown too, according to these regulations. However, this was rarely done in practice and the flag of Albania was ever-present in Kosovo during the UNMIK period.

Prior to the declaration of independence, Kosovo used a flag featuring a map of Kosovo against a blue background, similar to the flag of Bosnia and Herzegovina and the flag of Cyprus.

Competition for a new flag
A competition for a new flag, held in June 2007, received 993 entries. Under the terms of UN talks, all such symbols would have to reflect the multi-ethnic nature of Kosovo, avoiding the use of the Albanian or Serbian double-headed eagles or the use of solely red and black or red, blue and white color schemes. Red and black are the colors used on the Albanian flag; red, blue and white are the main colors used on the Serbian flag. Additionally, all entries had to be rectangular and have a 2:3 proportion. The Kosovo Symbols Commission eventually selected three designs, which were then voted on by the Assembly of Kosovo (with a two-thirds majority required for approval), when independence was declared after the status talks. The three proposals selected were forwarded to the Assembly on 4 February 2008.

The proposals and final choice
 Blue field with a white map of Kosovo surrounded by five stars. The stars vary in size and represent the different ethnic groups that reside in Kosovo. The largest star would represent ethnic Albanians.
 A vertical tricolour of black, white and red.
 A vertical tricolour of black, white and red with a spiral (Dardanian symbol of the rotating sun) in the center of the white stripe.

Representatives of the people of Kosovo voted on 17 February 2008 to use a variant of the first proposal. The modified version has an additional star, makes the stars equal in size, switches the colors of the stars and map, makes the map bigger, and arranges the stars in a curve above the map.

Other proposals

Ibrahim Rugova, the first president of Kosovo, introduced the "flag of Dardania" on October 29, 2000. The flag was blue, inscribed with a red disc with a golden ring. Inside the red disc is the Albanian eagle. The eagle is holding a ribbon with the legend "Dardania" inscribed. This flag did not gain much popularity, Dardania is the name of an ancient region in the same general area as Kosovo. It was occasionally used at cultural and sports events during the UNMIK period and was also used at Rugova's funeral to cover his coffin. It was used as a presidential standard and by the two Rugovan political parties, the Democratic League of Kosovo and the Democratic League of Dardania. The flag of Dardania is shown as the Presidential Flag on the Kosovo presidency website, making it official. Since the election of Vjosa Osmani as the President of Kosovo, the Dardania Flag has again featured heavily in the institution of the presidency.

See also
List of flags of Kosovo
Emblem of Kosovo
National symbols of Kosovo
Flag of Albania
List of Albanian flags
Coat of arms of Albania
Armorial of Albania
Albanian heraldry

Notes

References

External links

 The Comprehensive proposal for Kosovo Status Settlement by UNOSEK
 Kosovo looking for state emblems

Kosovo
Flags adopted through competition
Flag
National flags
Flags of states with limited recognition
Kosovo